All Together may refer to:

Arts and media

Film and television
All Together (1942 film), a 1942 cartoon promoting war bonds
All Together (2011 film), a 2011 French film
All Together (professional wrestling), professional wrestling events

Music
"All Together", song by Alain Johannes 1991
"All Together", song from Ascend (Illenium album)

Political organizations
All Together (South Korea), a political organization in South Korea
All Together (Serbia), a political organization in Serbia
All Together (Kazakhstan), a political party in Kazakhstan

See also
 All Together Now (disambiguation)